The Lovely Eggs are a two-piece lo-fi psychedelic punk rock band from Lancaster, England. They consist of married couple Holly Ross and David Blackwell. Ross was formerly the lead singer and guitarist in the all-female band Angelica.

Career
The band formed in 2006, playing their first ever gig in New York City and then returning to the UK to play nationwide shows. They gained recognition from radio coverage on BBC Radio 1 and BBC Radio 6, from DJs such as Marc Riley, Huw Stephens and Steve Lamacq.

In May 2008, they were invited into the BBC Radio 6 studio to do a live session for Marc Riley's Brain Surgery show. In August of the same year, they were again invited back to the BBC to do a session for Huw Stephens, this time for BBC Radio 1. In October 2008, their first EP entitled Have You Ever Heard The Lovely Eggs? was released through Cherryade Records, which was again well received with positive reviews and more airplay. In the same month, the lead track from their Have You Ever Heard The Lovely Eggs? EP ("Have You Ever Heard A Digital Accordion?"), was named XFM 'Single of The Week' by John Kennedy and subsequently played every night of that week on his show.

They released their debut album, If You Were Fruit, in June 2009 on Cherryade Records in the UK, and in August on HHBTM Records in the US, and promoted both with a tour of the UK and US. The next release was a Twin Peaks inspired, limited edition Halloween CD. It was released in October 2009, promoted with an exclusive video for Artrocker TV. Following this, the band collaborated on a limited edition cassette release, with an all-female band from Manchester, Hotpants Romance, with songs that were won in a raffle by audience members whilst the two bands toured together in June 2009. The tape named Songs about People We met on Tour was released in February 2010.

The Lovely Eggs were invited to perform at SXSW in March 2010, where they recorded a live video collaboration with musician and artist Jad Fair from the band Half Japanese. In early 2010, they also toured in the UK with Eddie Argos from Art Brut's new band, Everybody Was In The French Resistance... Now.
They spent the rest of 2010 touring and playing festivals.

On 30 January 2011, they released their single "Don't Look at Me (I Don't Like It)", for which the video featured a guest appearance from "John Shuttleworth" as the man with the sausage roll thumb. The single gained plays from Radio 1 and 6 Music. The album Cob Dominos from which the single came was released on 14 February 2011. The second single "Fuck It" from the album Cob Dominos was released on limited edition 7" vinyl on 30 May, a bank holiday Monday, which true to the band's "fuck it" philosophy meant not only could DJs not play it, but all the shops were shut so no one could buy it. However its B-side, "Watermelons", did enjoy radio play from 6 music DJs. The band toured the UK and Europe after the album's release, including a European tour supporting Art Brut in September 2011.
The third single from Cob Dominos, "Panic Plants" was released on 7" vinyl 31 October 2011 accompanied by a video by Eilir Pierce.

On 5 December 2011, they released the first 7" single "Allergies" from their third album Wildlife on the Too Pure Label. The single was produced by Gruff Rhys who also appeared in the video (produced by Casey Raymond). Allergies won the vote in Steve Lamacq's round table on 6 music and also won Steve Lamacq's rebel playlist with 82% of the public vote. The single sold out before release date and received airplay from both 6 Music and Radio 1.
"Food", the second single from their then forthcoming album Wildlife, was released on 14 May 2012. Following its release Cornershop's Tjinder Singh remixed the track for release on his own Ample Play label.

"Wildlife" was released on 26 November 2012, with their third and final single from the album "I Just Want Someone To Fall In Love With" being released the previous week.

The Lovely Eggs toured to promote Wildlife while Holly was five months pregnant, and the band took a short break before releasing their fourth album This Is Our Nowhere in April 2015.

On 27 April 2015, "Magic Onion" the first single from This Is Our Nowhere was released on 7" green splatter vinyl on the Cardiff-based label Flower of Phong, run by video director Casey Raymond and was accompanied by an illustrated booklet designed by Casey. The single received airplay on 6 Music and Radio 1 and was accompanied by a video also made by Casey Raymond.

On Record Store Day 2015, the band released a special early edition black and white pressed vinyl LP of This Is Our Nowhere: a title which sums up the band's celebration and love of a scene which doesn't exist in the eyes of the manufactured mainstream.The record received 8/10 in NME magazine.

In November 2015, the band released the second single from the album "Goofin Around In Lancashire" released on 7" "Egg" Vinyl, presented in a hand-packaged plastic case. The song received airplay on both 6 Music and Radio 1 with Marc Riley declaring it one of his top tracks of 2015. The Lovely Eggs were invited in to play two sessions for Marc Riley one after each single release.
The Lovely Eggs toured the UK in March, May and November 2015 promoting the This Is Our Nowhere album after each single release and played mainly sold-out gigs. They have been described in NME as "One of the country's most beloved underground bands."

In October 2016, they released 7" Vinyl "Drug Braggin" on Egg Records. Follow-up 7", "I Shouldn't Have Said That" was released in November 2017.

This Is Eggland, produced by Dave Fridmann and released in early 2018, displays a new musical direction for the band, a "heaviness that at one stage would have seemed unthinkable".

Discography

Singles
"I Like Birds But I Like Other Animals Too" - Split 7" with The Sexual Hot Bitches (2008) (Filthy Little Angels)
"Haunt Me Out" Limited Edition CD with free half-heart Laura Palmer necklace (October 2009) (Cherryade Records)
"Don't Look At Me (I Don't Like It)" (2011) (Cherryade Records)
"Fuck It" 7" Vinyl (30 May 2011) (Cherryade Records)
"Panic Plants" 7" Vinyl (31 October 2011) (Cherryade Records)
"Allergies" 7" Yellow Vinyl (5 December 2011) (Too Pure)
"Food" 7" Vinyl (14 May 2012) (Cherryade Records)
"I Just Want Someone To Fall In Love With" (19 November 2012) (Egg Records)
"Magic Onion" 7" Vinyl splatter vinyl (27 April 2015) (Flower of Phong)
"Goofin Around In Lancashire" 7" Vinyl White Egg (13 November 2015) (Egg Records)
"Drug Braggin'" 7" Psychedelic Swirl Vinyl (October 2016) (Egg Records)
"I Shouldn't Have Said That" (November 2017) (Egg Records)
"Wiggy Giggy" 7" Limited Edition Vinyl (16 February 2018) (Egg Records)
"This Decision" (10 January 2020) (Egg Records)
"Still Second Rate" (03 April 2020) (Egg Records)

EPs
Fried Egg CD (2007) Homemade Limited edition CDR
Have You Ever Heard The Lovely Eggs? 7" Yellow Vinyl (2008) (Cherryade Records)

Albums
If You Were Fruit (2009) (Cherryade Records) (Happy Happy Birthday To Me Records - US release)
Cob Dominos (2011) (Cherryade Records)
Wildlife (2012) (Egg Records)
This Is Our Nowhere (2015) (Record store day vinyl only release 25 April, full release 4 May) (Egg Records)
This Is Eggland (2018) (Egg Records)
I Am Moron (2020)

Tapes
Songs About People We Met On Tour (2010) Collaboration with Manchester band Hotpants Romance

Compilation appearances
"Have You Ever Heard a Digital Accordion?" Grrrls Talk Compilation (Four Life Entertainment) (Japan) (October 2010)
"I Like Birds But I Like Other Animals Too" on Broadcast One: New music handpicked by Dandelion Radio CD (2010) (Odd Box Records)
"I Like Birds But I Like Other Animals Too" SXSW Liverpool Soundcity Promo Compilation CD (March 2009)
"Tyrannosaurus Rex for Christmas" (Cherryade 4 Christmas Comp) Cherryade Records (UK) (December 2008)
"In Watermelon Sugar" (Recipe Book compilation) The Recipe Book Records (NL) (September 2008)
"I'm in Your Scene" (Ladyfest Manchester Compilation) Cherryade Records (UK) (August 2008)
"I'm Going to Build My Snowman Better Than Yours" (Cherryade 3 Christmas Compilation) Cherryade Records (UK) (December 2007)
"In Watermelon Sugar" on Ammehoelahop Vinyl LP (Transformed Dreams) (NL) (October 2006)

References

External links

The Lovely Eggs on MySpace

 
 
 
 
 

English indie rock groups
Rock music duos
British indie pop groups
English musical duos
Male–female musical duos
Musical groups from Lancashire